Sergey Tsvir (born 8 February 1974) is a Russian wrestler. He competed in the men's Greco-Roman 82 kg at the 1996 Summer Olympics.

References

1974 births
Living people
Russian male sport wrestlers
Olympic wrestlers of Russia
Wrestlers at the 1996 Summer Olympics
Place of birth missing (living people)